Heritage of the Desert is a 1939 American Western film directed by Lesley Selander and written by Norman Houston and Harrison Jacobs. The film stars Donald Woods, Evelyn Venable, Russell Hayden, Robert Barrat, Sidney Toler, C. Henry Gordon and Willard Robertson. It is based on the novel The Heritage of the Desert by Zane Grey. The film was released on June 23, 1939, by Paramount Pictures.

Plot

Cast 
Donald Woods as John Abbott
Evelyn Venable as Miriam Naab
Russell Hayden as David Naab
Robert Barrat as Andrew Naab
Sidney Toler as Nosey
C. Henry Gordon as Henry Holderness
Willard Robertson as Henchman Nebraska
Paul Guilfoyle as Snap Thornton
Paul Fix as Henchman Chick Chance
John 'Skins' Miller as Postmaster John Twerk
Reginald Barlow as Judge Stevens

References

External links 
 

1939 films
American black-and-white films
1930s English-language films
Films scored by Victor Young
Films directed by Lesley Selander
Paramount Pictures films
American Western (genre) films
1939 Western (genre) films
Films based on works by Zane Grey
Revisionist Western (genre) films
1930s American films